Joseph de Toro was mayor of Ponce, Puerto Rico, starting in 1710.

Background
De Toro was capitán de granaderos (herdsmen captain), a governmental position, during the 1812 mayoral administration of Jose Ortiz de la Renta.

Mayoral term 
Eduardo Neumann Gandia states that Joseph de Toro was mayor of Ponce starting in 1710. It is not known with certainty, however, when De Toro ended his mayoral term. However, it is likely he was still the mayor of Ponce three years later when Puerto Rico governor Francisco Danío Granados ordered, in 1713, that together with those of Coamo, Guaynabo, Caguas, Loiza and Santurce, the hato and estancia owners in the Ponce were to contribute a tax for the reconstruction of the San Antonio bridge in San Juan.

See also

 List of Puerto Ricans
 List of mayors of Ponce, Puerto Rico

References

Year of birth unknown
Year of death unknown
Mayors of Ponce, Puerto Rico